The Choc River is a river in the Soufrière Quarter of the island country of Saint Lucia.  It flows to the Caribbean Sea.

See also
List of rivers of Saint Lucia

References

Rivers of Saint Lucia